The 2007 Sandwell Metropolitan Borough Council election took place on 3 May 2007 to elect members of Sandwell Metropolitan Borough Council in the West Midlands, England. One third of the council was up for election and the Labour Party stayed in overall control of the council.

After the election, the composition of the council was:
Labour 51
Conservative 10
Liberal Democrat 6
British National Party 4
Vacant 1

Campaign
Before the election Labour ran the council with 50 councillors, compared to 12 for the Conservatives, 5 Liberal Democrats, 4 British National Party and 1 independent. Labour defended 19 of the seats being contested, with the other parties hoping to make gains from Labour.

The British National Party put up 15 candidates, aiming to build on the 3 gains they had made in the 2006 election. The party campaigned on immigration, housing and crime and were hoping to take all 3 seats in Princes End ward for the first time anywhere in the United Kingdom. However the British National Party was accused of "distortion and lies" by Labour and the Conservatives described the British National Party's councillors as an "embarrassment".

In the last couple of days before polling day, the council sent an advertising van around the area to remind voters about the election.

Election result
The results saw the Labour party easily stay in control of the council, with the Labour leader of the council describing the results as "remarkable". Labour gained one seat from the Conservatives in St Pauls ward to move to 51 seats after winning 20 of the seats contested. The Conservatives also lost a seat in Yew Tree to the Liberal Democrats. They meant both the Conservatives and Liberal Democrats won 2 seats each in the election, with the Conservatives dropping to 10 seats and the Liberal Democrats going up to 6.

The British National Party failed to win any seats, staying on 4 councillors, coming closest to victory in Princes End where they were 20 votes behind Labour. A further seat was vacant after independent councillor Alan Burkitt was automatically disqualified after having been given a suspended sentence.

Ward results

References

2007 English local elections
2007
2000s in the West Midlands (county)